Ohessaare Landscape Conservation Area is a nature park which is located in Saare County, Estonia.

The area of the nature park is 6 ha.

The protected area was founded in 1959 to protect Ohessaare Cliff and adjacent gravel beach. In 2006, the protected area was designated to the landscape conservation area.

References

Nature reserves in Estonia
Geography of Saare County